Samuel Wesley (1766–1837) was an English organist and composer.

Samuel Wesley may also refer to:

Samuel Wesley (poet) (1662–1735), English poet and churchman
Samuel Wesley (the Younger) (1691–1739), English poet and churchman
Samuel Sebastian Wesley (1810–1876), English organist and composer
Samuel Robert Wesley (died 1877), Royal Marines officer